The fifth season of The Voice of Vietnam began on May 20, 2018. The coaching panel this season consists of returning coaches Thu Phương, Tóc Tiên, Noo Phước Thịnh; and former The Voice Kids coach Lam Trường. 

This season was won by Trần Ngọc Ánh from team Noo Phước Thịnh. With her victory, Trần Ngọc Ánh became the first wildcard act to win the competition in the history of The Voice of Vietnam, and overall, the second wildcard act to win among all The Voice versions worldwide (the first was Anja Nissen of The Voice Australia). Also for the first time, the final 4 were all female.

Coaches and hosts

The coaching panel saw two changes from the previous season as it was revealed on April 6, 2018. Noo Phước Thịnh and Tóc Tiên returned for their second season as coaches. Thu Phương returned to the panel after one season hiatus, replacing Thu Minh; while former The Voice Kids coach Lam Trường joined the show as a new coach, replacing Đông Nhi. Meanwhile, former Sing My Song presenter Phí Linh replaced Nguyên Khang as the show's new host. Last season's winner, Ali Hoàng Dương, served as the backstage presenter during the Blind auditions.

The blind audition this season adopted the "Block" twist from the fourteenth season of the U.S version, which prevents a coach from getting an artist if they turn their chairs. The team sizes were reduced to 10 per team.

Teams
Color key

Blind auditions 
The Blind auditions were taped on April 18 and 19, 2018, and were broadcast from May 20 to June 17.

Color key

Episode 1 (May 20)

Episode 2 (May 27)

Episode 3 (June 3) 

1 Tóc Tiên pressed Noo's button.

Episode 4 (June 10)

Episode 5 (June 17)

Notes

The Battles 
The Battle round was taped on June 4, 2018 and was broadcast from June 24 to July 15, 2018. The Battles' advisors for this season are: music producer Dương Cầm for team Thu Phương, former Sing My Song judges Nguyễn Hải Phong and Hồ Hoài Anh for team Lam Trường and Noo Phước Thịnh respectively, and diva Trần Thu Hà for team Tóc Tiên. Each coach can steal two losing artists from other coaches' teams, as previously applied in season 3. However, in a new twist, a "double-pick" is given to each team to save both contestants in a pairing under the condition that they would become a duo for the rest of the competition.

Hoàng Mạnh from team Noo Phước Thịnh was disqualified from the competition prior to the Battle taping day due to his undisciplined behavior during the rehearsal process. As a result, Noo Phước Thịnh grouped three of his artists into one battle, with two advanced and one eliminated.

Color key:

1Referred in short as Đức Tâm & Hoàng Dương for the rest of the competition.
2Referred in short as An Nhiên & Kiều Trang for the rest of the competition.

The Knockouts/ The Cross Battles 
The Knockouts was taped on June 27 and broadcast from July 22 to August 5, 2018. For the first time in the show's history as well as The Voice franchise, the Knockouts would not be team-based but instead feature battles between members in different teams. Contestants from all four teams were paired randomly into one knockout battle, with the winner advanced to the Playoffs and the loser sent home. Each coach had three turns to "challenge" the other three coaches for a cross knockout battle. The challenge coach was allowed to select his/her own team member in a battle, and the chosen contestant would pick his/her knockout opponent randomly from the challenged coach's team. When there is only one contestant left in each team, the power to challenge other coaches would be granted to the coach with the highest number of winning battle.

After two performances in a battle concluded, a 21-member professional jury gave their points to each contestant publicly, whereas audience in the studio also voted for the two contestants. Those numbers were then added up to a total point to determine the winner of a knockout battle. As a result, the number of contestants advanced to the Playoff round between four teams would vary depending on the number of wins or losses of the team in the knockout battles. The "steal" was also not available as this stage of the competition this season. 

Đào Bình Nhi, a contestant from team Thu Phương who was paired up with Việt Puzo into a duo in the Battle round, withdrew due to personal reasons. Therefore, Việt Puzo competed in this round as a solo contestant.

Color key:

Notes

The Playoffs 
Like the previous season, all the Playoffs round are pre-recorded except the Grand Finale. However, rather than cutting the same number of contestant on each team every week, this season the elimination result is determined solely by the public vote for each contestant and no longer involve coaches' decisions. Contestants who received the fewest public vote will be eliminated instantly regardless of which team they are from.

The "Wildcard" twist is also applied this season, which will advance an artist who has been eliminated prior to the Grand Finale but received the highest public vote on the website SaoStar.vn immediately to the Grand Finale for a second chance to compete for the title. The voting window for the Wildcard was closed on August 15, 2018 and the Wildcard was rewarded to Trần Ngọc Ánh (team Noo Phước Thịnh), who eventually emerged as the winner.

Color key:

Week 1 (August 12) 
The top 14 performed for the public's vote altogether. At the end of this round, four artists with the lowest vote were automatically eliminated.

Week 2: Quarterfinals (Top 10) (August 19) 
The top 10 performed for the public's vote altogether. At the end of this round, three artists with the lowest vote were automatically eliminated.

Week 3: Semifinals (Top 7) (August 26) 
The 7 semi-finalists performed for the public's vote altogether. At the end of this round, three artists with the lowest vote were automatically eliminated, leaving four artists advanced to next week's Grand Finale. With the elimination of Nguyễn Thị Thu Ngân, Thu Phương no longer had any artists remaining on her team. For the first time in the history of The Voice of Vietnam, a coach was not represented in the Grand Finale. Trần Ngọc Ánh from team Noo Phước Thịnh was originally eliminated at this round, but won the Wildcard and thus advanced to the finale. With her advancement to the finale, Noo Phước Thịnh also became the first coach in the show's history to have three artists in the final stage of the competition.

The Grand Finale 
The Grand Finale was broadcast live, coincidentally on the Vietnamese National Day (September 2). This week, the final five performed a solo song and a duet with his/her coach. The voting window for the finale was opened a week prior to the finale day on the website SaoStar.vn. The artist achieved the highest accumulated vote from the website and SMS was crowned the winner.

Elimination chart

Overall

Artist's info

Result details

Teams

Artist's info

Result details

Contestants who appeared on previous shows or seasons
 Trần Duy Khang competed on the second season of The X Factor Vietnam and was eliminated at the Four-chair Challenge stage.
 An Nhiên competed on the sixth season of Vietnam Idol and reached top 20.
 Đỗ Hoàng Dương competed on the first season of The Voice Kids and joined team Giang Hồ where he was eliminated in the Battle round.
 Lưu Hiền Trinh was on the second season of The X Factor, as a member of the group S-Girl, where they came fourth.
 Dương Quốc Anh was on the second season of The X Factor but did not make it past the Judges' Auditions.
 Y Lux competed on the seventh season of Vietnam Idol and finished in the top 10.
 Nguyễn Hương Giang competed on season 1 of The Voice of Vietnam]] and joined team Hồ Ngọc Hà but was eliminated at the first live round.
 Huỳnh Thanh Thảo was on the second season of The X Factor, as a member of the group Dolphins, where they came seventh.
 Hoàng Mạnh competed on [[The Voice of Vietnam (season 1)|season 1 of The Voice of Vietnam but was eliminated in the Battle round.
 Nguyễn Minh Ngọc competed on the first season of The X Factor Vietnam and reached the top 16, but was eliminated at the first liveshow.

References

1
2017 Vietnamese television seasons
2010s Vietnamese television series